"Sweet Virginia", a slow country-inspired song, was written by Mick Jagger and Keith Richards. It is the sixth track on the Rolling Stones' 1972 double album Exile On Main St.. 

The song features a harmonica solo by Jagger and a saxophone solo by Bobby Keys. Drummer Charlie Watts plays a country shuffle rhythm. An alternate version without the backing singers was released on bootlegs. 

The version of the song that the band re-recorded for Stripped is featured in Martin Scorsese's 1995 film Casino. The original recording is played over the closing credits of Rian Johnson's 2019 film Knives Out.

History 
"Sweet Virginia" is an acoustic song that is thought to be influenced by Gram Parsons and the drug-fueled atmosphere of Nellcôte, where the album was mostly recorded during a series of chaotic recording sessions.  The lyrics allude to drug use and pills and low-grade heroin (“drop your reds, drop your greens and blues”, "I hid the speed inside my shoe", and "got to scrape that shit right off your shoes").

Legal problems
After the release of Exile on Main St., Allen Klein sued the Rolling Stones for breach of settlement because "Sweet Virginia" and four other songs on the album were composed while Jagger and Richards were under contract with Klein's company ABKCO Records. ABKCO acquired publishing rights to these songs, giving it a share of the royalties from Exile on Main St..  Additionally, ABKCO was able to publish another album consisting of previously released Rolling Stones songs, More Hot Rocks (Big Hits & Fazed Cookies).

Live performances
"Sweet Virginia" was performed by the Stones during their 1972 American tour, and it was featured in the concert film Ladies and Gentlemen: The Rolling Stones, released in 1974.  The Stones performed the song occasionally in 1973, and it returned to their set-lists on their 1994 Voodoo Lounge Tour, 2005 A Bigger Bang Tour, and 2017 No Filter Tour.

"Sweet Virginia" has also been covered in concert by the bands  Phish and Old Crow Medicine Show.

The song was also released as the B-side of the Stones' "Rocks Off" single in Japan.

Personnel

According to authors Philippe Margotin and Jean-Michel Guesdon:

The Rolling Stones
Mick Jagger vocals, harmonica
Keith Richards backing vocals, acoustic guitar
Mick Taylor backing vocals, lead acoustic guitar
Bill Wyman bass
Charlie Watts drums

Additional musicians
Ian Stewart piano
Bobby Keys saxophone
Unidentified musicians backing vocals, hand claps

Notes

References

Sources

 
 

The Rolling Stones songs
Songs written by Jagger–Richards
Song recordings produced by Jimmy Miller
1972 songs